Suszec  (German Sussetz) is a village in Pszczyna County, Silesian Voivodeship, in southern Poland. It is the seat of the gmina (administrative district) called Gmina Suszec.

The village has a population of 4,491.

In the area of the village there is the Parish of St. Stanislaus the Bishop and Martyr and Krupiński Coal Mine.

In 2004. Suszec won the first edition of the competition "Beautiful Village of Silesian Voivodeship" in the category "most beautiful village".

Name and crest
The name of Suszec appeared in the list of Polish towns only one time. It comes from the word "suchy" (dry), as 300 years ago the neighboring areas were covered with swamps and bogs, and only the village of Suszec was a place acceptable for living and working.

The branchy tree is a crest of Suszec - at least from the end the 18th century. On May 10, 1994 the Commune Council accepted and confirmed the crest of Suszec in this form. The tree is also a crest for the whole commune.

Parts

History 
The village was first mentioned in 1326 in the register of Peter's Pence payment among Catholic parishes of Oświęcim deaconry of the Diocese of Kraków as Susechz.

During the political upheaval caused by Matthias Corvinus the land around Pszczyna was overtaken by Casimir II, Duke of Cieszyn, who sold it in 1517 to the Hungarian magnates of the Thurzó family, forming the Pless state country. In the accompanying sales document issued on 21 February 1517 the village was mentioned as Sussecz. The Kingdom of Bohemia in 1526 became part of the Habsburg monarchy. In the War of the Austrian Succession most of Silesia was conquered by the Kingdom of Prussia, including the village.

In January 1945, the so-called death marches from the Auschwitz-Birkenau camp in Oświęcim to the railroad station in Wodzisław Śląski passed through the village.

Franciszek Błażyca, a foreman of the Silesian Province Police, one of the victims of the Katyn massacre, was born here.

Tourism and recreation 
The area of the Suszec commune is surrounded on all sides by forests - the remains of the so-called Pszczyna Forest - protecting the commune from pollution from the nearby urban agglomerations. Part of the forests in the area of Suszec and Rudziczka belongs to the landscape park (and park buffer zone) "Rudy Landscape Park". Moreover, in the northern part of the commune there is a "Babczyna Dolina nature reserve". It is worth noting that in the commune there are about 120 plant species listed in the "Red Book" of rare and vanishing species in Poland.

To the southwest of the village there is a recreation and holiday center "Gwaruś", which belongs to the commune. It was established on the basis of one of the oldest ponds in here with the area of 9.3 ha. In 1983, in the area of the pond, works were commenced with the aim of building a recreation center of the Krupiński Coal Mine in Suszec; to this end, the existing reservoir was divided into two smaller ones (the eastern one - recreation and the western one - breeding). The works were completed in 1986 and the pond "Godziek" was renamed to "Gwaruś" (the first name "Godziek" came from the name of the first owner from the 15th century - Godźek). Since 1999 the whole center has been managed by the Communal Cultural Centre and the Municipal Office in Suszec (GOK). Since 2017. "Gwaruś" with the adjacent land was leased by a private company.

References

External links 
 Jewish Community in Suszec on Virtual Shtetl

Suszec